Nikolai Alekseevich Severtzov (5 November 1827 –  8 February 1885) was a Russian explorer and naturalist.

Severtzov studied at the Moscow University and at the age of eighteen he came into contact with G. S. Karelin and took an interest in central Asia. In 1857, he joined a mission to Syr-Darya. On the expedition to the Syr Darya, he was captured by bandits and freed after a month. In 1865–68, he explored the Tian Shan mountains and Lake Issyk Kul. In 1877–78, he explored the Pamir Mountains, following a route close to the current Pamir Highway as far as Lake Yashil Kul on the Ghunt River.

Severtzov wrote the Vertical and Horizontal Distribution of Turkestan Wildlife (1873), which included the first description of a number of animals. Among them is a subspecies of argali (wild sheep) later named after him: Ovis ammon severtzovi. He also described many new species and subspecies of birds. The Spotted Great Rosefinch Carpodacus severtzovi is among those named after him.

Severtzov began to assemble a collection of birds in the estate of Petrovskoe. On 8 February 1885, he was returning home in a carriage along the frozen Ikorts river that feeds into the Don. The carriage broke the ice and plunged. While everyone extricated themselves and attempted to find a warm place nearby, he delayed by searching for his portfolio and collapsed. His driver froze to death.

The Institute of Ecology and Evolution of the Russian Academy of Sciences in Moscow is named after his son Alexey Severtzov.

References

1827 births
1885 deaths
Explorers from the Russian Empire
Russian ornithologists
Explorers of Central Asia